Etter is an unincorporated community in Ravenna Township, Dakota County, Minnesota, United States, near Hastings and Welch. It is along 200th Street East (County Road 68) near Ravenna Trail (County Road 54). State Highway 316 (MN 316) is nearby.

A post office called Etter was established in 1871, and remained in operation until it was discontinued in 1927. The community was named for Alexander Etter, a storekeeper.

References

Unincorporated communities in Dakota County, Minnesota
Unincorporated communities in Minnesota